Kirstin Matthews is a Fellow in Science and Technology Policy at the James A. Baker III Institute for Public Policy. Matthews received a bachelor's degree in biochemistry from the University of Texas at Austin and a PhD in molecular biology from the University of Texas Health Science Center. Matthews has published multiple policy recommendations pertaining to stem cell research, climate change, and health care.

Research
Matthews is a Fellow in Science and Technology Policy] at the Baker Institute for Public Policy, which is located at Rice University in Houston, Texas. She conducts research on policy and ethical issues associated with emerging biotechnology such as regenerative medicine, vaccines and genomic research. She was the project director for the task force, Access to Health Care in Texas: Challenges of the Uninsured and Underinsured, from 2004 to 2006. The task force released a series of reports on the uninsured in the state title "Code Red".

Selected publications by Matthews include:
 International Stem Cell Collaboration: How Disparate Policies between the United States and the United Kingdom Impact Research (2011),
 Stem Cell Research in the Greater Middle East: The Importance of Establishing Policy and Ethics Interoperability to Foster International Collaborations (2010),
 Conference Report – Stem Cell Policy in the Obama Age: Texas, U.S. and U.K. Perspectives (2010),
 WANTED: Federal Stem Cell Research Oversight (2009),
 Stem Cell Science and Policy Overview (2009),
 Science and Technology: Recommendations for the Next Administration (2008),
 Human Embryonic Stem Cell Research: Recommendations for the Next Administration (2008),
 Conference Report – Beyond Science: The Economics and Politics of Responding to Climate Change (2008),
 Hot Topic: Stem Cell Controversy—Are Human Skin Cells Really the Breakthrough? (2007), and
 U.S. Stem Cell Policy – Unintended Consequences (2007).
Her work has been utilized by the National Institutes of Health and United States Congress in policymaking.

Blog
In addition to doing research for the Baker Institute, Matthews also contributes to the Baker Institute Blog for the Houston Chronicle.

Teaching
Matthews is a lecturer at Rice University. Her most recent courses include SOCI 314 – Science at Risk? Out of the Lab and into the Public Sphere (with Elaine Howard Ecklund) and NSCI 511 – Science Policy and Ethics.

Membership
Matthews has served on the American Association for the Advancement of Science since 2003 and at the International Society for Stem Cell Research since 2007.

In 2010, Matthews was invited onto a national talk show to discuss stem cell policy hosted by Armstrong Williams.

Sources

References

External links 
 Baker Institute
 Rice University

American women biochemists
Living people
University of Texas at Austin College of Natural Sciences alumni
University of Texas Health Science Center at Houston alumni
21st-century American women scientists
Year of birth missing (living people)